La Llanada is a town and municipality in the Nariño Department, Colombia.

Climate
La Llanada has a warm subtropical highland climate (Köppen Cfb) with heavy rain for the majority of the year and a drier season from June to September.

References

Municipalities of Nariño Department